Lake Echo (2021 population: 2,365) is an unincorporated suburban community located in Nova Scotia, Canada that is part of the Halifax Regional Municipality; approximately 15 kilometres east of Dartmouth.

The area is mostly residential, with several subdivisions built in the 60's by Faber Construction LTD as well as in the 1980s and 1990s.

2008 fire
On June 13, 2008 a forest fire broke out near Porters Lake, destroying two houses, damaging several others and burning six thousand acres of forest in total. The fire was believed to be caused by a camp fire and the Royal Canadian Mounted Police laid no charges however it was determined that residue from Hurricane Juan fuelled the fire. The fire was the largest in an urban area fought in Nova Scotia and the largest fire in 30 years.

Gallery

References

External links
Nova Scotia DOT Webcam
Orenda Canoe Club
Lake Echo & District Fire Department
HRM Youth Lake Echo
2008 Fire
Nova Scotia Government News release

Communities in Halifax, Nova Scotia
General Service Areas in Nova Scotia